Bonding protocol (short for "Bandwidth On Demand Interoperability Group") is a generic name for a method of bonding or aggregation of multiple physical links to form a single logical link. Bonding is the term often used in Linux implementations: on Windows based systems the term teaming is often used, and between network-devices we talk about link aggregation, LAG and Link Aggregation Control Protocol.

Major categories 
 Asynchronous bonding protocol
 Synchronous bonding protocol

See also
 Channel bonding
 Inverse multiplexer
 Link aggregation

References

External links